Lu, Lü, or LU may refer to:

Arts and entertainment
 Lu (music), Tibetan folk music
 Lu (duo), a Mexican band
 Lu (album)
 Character from Mike, Lu & Og
 Lupe Fiasco or Lu (born 1982), American musician
 Lebor na hUidre, a manuscript containing many Irish fictional stories commonly abbreviated LU
Lu (novel), 2018 novel by Jason Reynolds

Chinese surnames
Lu (surname), including:
Lu (surname 卢), the 52nd commonest
Lu (surname 陆), the 61st commonest
Lu (surname 鲁), the 115th commonest
Lu (surname 路), the 116th commonest
Lu (surname 芦), the 140th commonest
Lu (surname 禄)
Lu (surname 逯)
Lu (surname 鹿)
Lü (surname), 吕, the 47th  commonest

Places

Asia
Lu (state) of ancient China, in today's Shandong Province 
Lü (state), an ancient Chinese state
Lu Commandery, of ancient China
Lù, a circuit (administrative division) in China
Lu, Iran, Isfahan Province
Lu County, Sichuan, China
La Union, Philippines, from its initials

Europe
LU postcode area in England
Lu, Piedmont, Alessandria, Italy
Lü, Switzerland, Graubünden
Province of Lucca, Italy, vehicle registration code
Canton of Lucerne, Switzerland, ISO 3166 code CH-LU
Luxembourg, ISO country code
Lú (county), or County of Louth, Ireland

Universities

Bangladesh
Leading University, Sylhet

Canada
Lakehead University, Thunder Bay, Ontario
Laurentian University, Sudbury, Ontario

Hong Kong
Lingnan University, Tuen Mun, Hong Kong

Latvia
University of Latvia, Riga

Lebanon
Lebanese University, Beirut

Sweden
Lund University, Scania

United States
Lamar University, Beaumont, Texas
Langston University, Oklahoma
Lehigh University, Bethlehem, Pennsylvania
Lindenwood University, St. Charles, Missouri
Liberty University, Lynchburg, Virginia

Science, technology, and mathematics
 .lu, Luxembourg's Internet domain
 LU decomposition of a  matrix  in mathematics
 Lutetium, symbol Lu, a chemical element

Languages 
 Lü language of South East Asia
 Luba-Katanga language, ISO 639-1 code, spoken in the Democratic Republic of the Congo

Other uses
 LU (biscuits), a French biscuit brand  
 Livestock Unit of grazing land
 London Underground, UK
 Lú or Lugh, an ancient god in Irish mythology
 Lū or laulau, Tongan name for leaves of taro
 Lǔ, a Chinese method of red cooking
 Lufax or Lu.com, Chinese financial technology company
 Lu people, a southeast Asian ethnic group 
 Lu, a hippopotamus at the Homosassa Springs Wildlife State Park
 LATAM Express, IATA code

See also 
 Lew (disambiguation)
 Lieu (disambiguation)
 Loo (disambiguation)
 Lou (disambiguation)
 Lue (disambiguation)
 Luu (disambiguation)